XHQT-FM is an FM radio station in Nogales, Sonora, Mexico. It broadcasts on 102.7 MHz and carries owner MVS Radio's Exa FM national format.

The station received its concession in December 1983; it has been owned by MVS since it signed on.

References

Radio stations in Sonora
Nogales, Sonora
MVS Radio